Popa (priest in Romanian) may refer to:

People
Alina Popa (born 1978), Romanian-Swiss, IFBB professional bodybuilder
Anatolie Popa (1896–1920), Moldavian military commander
Celestina Popa (born 1970), Romanian, artistic gymnast
Constantin Popa (born 1971), Romanian-Israeli basketball player
Gabriel Popa (painter) (1937–1995), Romanian painter
Grigore T. Popa (1892–1948), Romanian physician
 Ilie Popa (1907–1983), Romanian mathematician
Ion Popa (disambiguation), several people
Loredan Popa (born 1980), Romanian canoer
Marius Popa (born 1978), Romanian footballer
Mihnea Popa (born 1973), Romanian-American mathematician
Nicolae Popa (judge) (born 1939), Romanian judge
Nicolae Popa (businessman) (born c. 1965), a Romanian businessman
Roxana Popa (born 1997), a Romanian born Spanish artistic gymnast
Sorin Popa (born 1953), a Romanian-American mathematician
Toma Popa (1908–1962), Romanian chess master
Tudor Petrov-Popa (born 1963), Moldovan-Romanian politician
Valter Popa, Romanian guitarist
Vasko Popa (1922–1991), Yugoslav poet of Romanian descent

Places
Mount Popa, a volcano in central Burma (Myanmar)
Patriarch Evtimiy Square, Sofia, Bulgaria, commonly known as Popa
Popa Falls, rapids in the Okavango River
Popa, Lesotho
Popocatépetl, a volcano in central Mexico

Other uses
Popa (mantis), a genus of praying mantises in the family Deroplatyidae
Porin Palloilijat (PoPa), a Finnish football club
Pop All General-Purpose Registers (popa), an instruction in x86 assembly language

Romanian-language surnames